Tower Hill railway station may refer to:

 Tower Hill (Staten Island Railway station), New York, New York, United States
 Tower Hill railway station (Devon), United Kingdom
 Tower Hill tube station, London, United Kingdom